The discography of Arun Shenoy, a Singaporean composer and music producer of Indian origin, consists of two studio albums, seven singles and one extended play (EP) release

Studio albums

Singles

Extended plays

References

Discographies of Singaporean artists